Severe Tropical Cyclone Vance was a tropical cyclone that struck Western Australia during the active 1998–99 Australian region cyclone season, and was also one of six tropical cyclones to form off the coast of Australia during that season.

Forming on 19 March 1999, in the Timor Sea, Vance then curved west-southwest where it recurved and struck the Gascoyne and Pilbara coasts of Western Australia on 22 March as a Category 5 cyclone on the Australian scale and dissipating the following day.

Vance caused severe damage across the western coast of Australia. The hardest hit town was Exmouth where 70 percent of the buildings sustained severe damage. However, because of advance warnings there were no reports of fatalities. Damage totaled AU 100,000,000 (1999 USD).

Meteorological history

An area of low pressure formed on 16 March, six hundred miles northwest of Darwin, Australia. The storm then quickly reached tropical depression strength as it curved over the Northern Territory causing no damage.

Interacting with a subtropical ridge, the storm moved westward and then southwestward where it reached Category 1 cyclone status on the 19th. The cyclone then continued southwestward, strengthening to a Category 5 storm overnight on 20 March with gusts of more than  winds. Vance reached a pressure of 910 millibars (hPa) before curving to the south, heading towards the Exmouth Gulf.

Vance then made landfall near Exmouth on 22 March as a strong Category 4 cyclone. Moving inland, the cyclone then turned a more south-southeasterly direction as before weakening to tropical storm status. Vance then became extratropical the next day, with its extratropical remnants producing gale force winds that affected South Australia, Victoria and Tasmania.

Preparations
Hundreds of people evacuated and authorities closed several roads. In addition, forecasters issued a red alert for the towns of Karratha, Onslow and Exmouth as the cyclone was predicted to bring strong damaging winds to that area while the areas south of the red alert warning area were put under a yellow alert or tropical storm warning. On the 22nd, forecasters predicted that Vance would make landfall between Onslow and Exmouth.

Impact

The surge caused severe beach erosion and sunk or damaged several barges. Wind damage in Exmouth was severe, as the storm destroyed over 110 homes and damaged over 220 others. In Onslow, the storm surge flooded several houses. Vance dropped  of rain over Western Australia. The heavy rain brought by Vance caused severe flash-flooding that knocked out power and communications. Elsewhere, floodwaters washed out several roads and affected areas already impacted by Cyclone Elaine days earlier. The remnants of Vance produced gale-force winds that caused a dust storm that struck Adelaide for several hours with visibility down to a few meters, and knocked down powerlines in Melbourne, leaving 50,000 people without power.

References

External links

1998–99 Australian region cyclone season
Tropical cyclones in Western Australia
Cyclone Vance
Retired Australian region cyclones
Category 5 Australian region cyclones
1990s in Western Australia